Hermann Simon (19 October 1906 – 7 April 1987) was a German wrestler. He competed in the men's Greco-Roman middleweight at the 1928 Summer Olympics.

References

External links
 

1906 births
1987 deaths
German male sport wrestlers
Olympic wrestlers of Germany
Wrestlers at the 1928 Summer Olympics
Sportspeople from Wiesbaden
20th-century German people